is a 1975 Japanese anime television series adaptation of Ouida's 1872 novel of the same name, produced by Nippon Animation. 52 episodes were produced. A film version was released in 1997.

The series represents the bond between a boy and his ever so faithful dog living in 19th century Flanders Hoboken. The emotional story shows the boy's struggles in life as his grandfather dies and leaves him with his dog. It shows how the hopes of becoming a great classical painter have been seemingly crushed by his grandfather's passing and the way he takes after that tragedy.

The anime series is notable for being the first official entry in the World Masterpiece Theater series (Calpis Children's Theater at the time).

Production
The animators conducted extensive research on 19th century Flanders Hoboken. Although it has to be said that a lot of features in the series are not Flemish but typically Dutch (the girl's hat and the tulips for example). The buildings depicted in the series were modeled after the Bokrijk open-air museum..  Although there have been some changes from the original story by Marie Louise de la Ramée, it has been faithful in keeping the storyline accurate.

Isao Takahata and Hayao Miyazaki also worked on the series, respectively as storyboard artist and key animator for episode 15.

Dog of Flanders aired on Fuji TV between January 5 and December 28, 1975. Having gone into production before Zuiyo Eizo and Nippon Animation division, episodes 1-20 and 24-26 of the anime were still originally credited to Zuiyo and broadcast in the Calpis Comic Theater series. In subsequent DVD releases Calpis Children's Theater title card was kept in all 52 episodes. The series was repeated daily in early mornings in 2012.

Film
It was distributed by Shochiku. It grossed ¥243,543,645 at the box office. The film was released on VHS in 1999 and later released on DVD in March 2000.

Cast
 Makoto Tsumura/Brady Bluhm  as Nello
 Sakura Tange/Debi Derryberry as Alois
 Kousei Yagi/Robert Loggia as Grandpa Jehan
 Honami Suzuki/Sean Young as the adult/Sister Alois
 Katsumi Toriumi/Richard Cansino as the adult Paul
 Yuriko Fuchizaki/Lara Cody as the young Paul
 Masato Hirano/Randy Montgomery as Hans
 Toshiyuki Morikawa/Scott Menville as the adult George
 Yoshiko Kamei/Ryan O'Donohue as the young George
 Yuko Sasaki as Nello's mother
 Bob Papenbrook as Ansole
 Sherry Lynn as Elina
 Michael McConnohie as Cogetz
 Matt K. Miller as Mr. Ike
 Chris Carroll as Art Store Owner
 Louise Chamis as Mrs. Nulette
 Brianne Siddall as Stephen
 Paul St. Peter as Art Judge #1
 Cliff Wells as Art Judge #2
 Mari Devon as Mrs. Jestas

Voices for orphan children provided by Jessica Evans, Dylan Hart, Sophie Lechken, Alex Mandelberg, Bryce Papenbrook.

References in other media
The main opening theme song "Yoake-no Michi" (よあけのみち) has always been popular in Japan since the series' debut. It was featured in a daydream sequence in the live action adaptation of Nodame Cantabile, starring Juri Ueno and Hiroshi Tamaki, with the character of Nodame singing the song while taking a bath. It was also used in the anime adaptation of Re:Zero -Starting Life in Another World- as protagonist Subaru Natsuki's ringtone.

See also

 My Patrasche, Tokyo Movie Shinsha's adaptation of Marie Louise de la Ramée's novel

References

External links
 Dog of Flanders (TV) at Nippon Animation's English website via Internet Archive
 The Dog of Flanders (film) at Nippon Animation's English website via Internet Archive
 The Dog of Flanders (film) at Nippon Animation  via Internet Archive
 
 
 

1975 anime television series debuts
1997 anime films
Animated films about dogs
Animated television series about dogs
Children's drama films
Drama anime and manga
Historical anime and manga
Films based on British novels
Works based on A Dog of Flanders
Films scored by Taro Iwashiro
Films set in the 19th century
Fuji TV original programming
Geneon USA
Japanese children's animated television series
Japanese children's films
Shochiku films
Television series set in the 19th century
Television shows based on British novels
Works set in Flanders
World Masterpiece Theater series
Television shows set in Belgium